Örnekköy (also called Tepetarla), is a village in Beykoz district of Istanbul Province, Turkey.

The population of Örnekköy is 3455 as of 2011.

References

Villages in Istanbul Province
Beykoz